Tajia Township (Mandarin: 塔加藏族乡) is a township in Hualong Hui Autonomous County, Haidong, Qinghai, China. In 2010, Tajia Township had a total population of 3,938: 1,999 males and 1,939 females: 950 aged under 14, 2,700 aged between 15 and 65 and 288 aged over 65.

References 
 

Township-level divisions of Qinghai
Ethnic townships of the People's Republic of China
Haidong